Alison Joyce Fenton (née Francis, 9 July 1927 – 15 January 2014) was a New Zealand fencer.

As Joyce Francis, she competed in the women's foil at the 1954 British Empire and Commonwealth Games in Vancouver, where she recorded one win and finished sixth out of seven competitors.

Fenton won the New Zealand national women's foil title in 1962, 1964, and 1965. At the 1966 British Empire and Commonwealth Games in Kingston, she won the bronze medal in the women's foil team alongside Pam French and Gaye McDermit. At those games, she also competed in the individual foil, but was unplaced.

Fenton died in Auckland on 15 January 2014, and her ashes were buried at Purewa Cemetery.

References

1923 births
2014 deaths
New Zealand female foil fencers
Fencers at the 1954 British Empire and Commonwealth Games
Fencers at the 1966 British Empire and Commonwealth Games
Commonwealth Games bronze medallists for New Zealand
Commonwealth Games medallists in fencing
Burials at Purewa Cemetery
Medallists at the 1966 British Empire and Commonwealth Games